Zoe Valentine is an American streaming television series produced and distributed by Brat. The series stars Anna Cathcart as the eponymous character. It also stars Diego Velazquez and Carter Southern. The series premiered on Brat's YouTube channel on January 16, 2019.

Synopsis

Season 1
Following the death of her older sister Cleo, Zoe Valentine is thrust into the upper echelon of Attaway High's social hierarchy. Caught between her old life and her sister's popularity, Zoe discovers herself and gets to know the sister she never really knew.

Season 2
Zoe struggles with her love life after her break up with her former boyfriend Milo Vargas. Keeping information from each other causes tensions between Zoe and her friend Brody Clemens especially after Viv Anderson, whom Brody is dating, and Riggs Williams, whom Zoe has taken liking to, come into the picture.

Cast

Main
 Anna Cathcart as Zoe Valentine, a high school freshman with an interest in stage magic
 Diego Velazquez as Brody Clemens, Zoe's best friend and fellow magic enthusiast
 Carter Southern as Isaac Jones, Cleo's boyfriend; he befriends Zoe after Cleo's death and is later revealed to be gay
 Josh Golombek as Kent Andrews, a patient who was in the hospital at the same time as Cleo and fell in love with her
 Josh Pafchek as Boots Botsman, a friend of Isaac and Milo's who hosts parties and makes insensitive jokes about being gay. He is a popular jock on the football team.
 Wes Armstrong as Tony Valentine, Zoe's father
 Debbie Fan as Brenda Valentine, Zoe's mother
 Mace Coronel as Milo Vargas (season 1), a friend of Isaac and Boots'; Zoe's love interest in Season 1. He is a jock on the football team.
 Brighton Sharbino as Allison Betts (season 1), Isaac's ex-girlfriend and Cleo's former rival
Bailey Sok as Viv Anderson (season 2), Brody's new girlfriend. She is very talented in art and is passionate about the environment.
 Hannah Spiros as Raya Williams (season 2), a girl Zoe meets in math class who introduces her to tarot cards
 Malik Barker as Riggs Williams (season 2), Raya's adoptive brother
 Lilia Buckingham as Autumn Miller (season 2), a Millwood student Zoe met in Spring Breakaway; Zoe confides in her when she is unable to turn to Brody

Recurring
Malia Tyler as Cleo Valentine, Zoe's deceased sister
Nino Hara as Casper Valentine (main season 1; guest season 2), Zoe's brother
Lauren Giraldo as Kiba (season 1)
Lily Chee as Britney (season 1)
Tariq Brown as Evan (season 2)
Jacob Melton as Austin DuPont (season 2)
Johnny Jay Lee as Elliot Fares (season 2)
Lilia Buckingham as Autumn Miller (season 2)
Kai Peters as Jesse (season 2)
Paul Toweh as Ty Walker (season 2)

Guest
Lauren Orlando as Kate Parker (season 2)
Annie LeBlanc as Rhyme McAdams (season 2)
Ireland Richards as young Cleo (season 2)
Matthew Taylor as Ricky (season 2)

Episodes

Series overview

Season 1 (2019)

Season 2 (2019)

Production
In November 2018, it was announced Anna Cathcart would star in web series produced and distributed by the Brat network, Zoe Valentine. Production for the first season took place that December. Season 1 contained 7 episodes; the first episode premiered on January 16, 2019 on YouTube. It was announced in July 2019 that Zoe Valentine had been renewed for a second season with production taking place that same month. Season 2 premiered on September 4.

Reception

Critical reception
Emily Ashby of Common Sense Media called the series a "thoughtful drama [that] explores serious themes with heart", described it as being "insightful and heartfelt" and described Zoe as being "positive model of kindness, respect, and loyalty", giving the series 4 out of 5 stars. The series was named a Common Sense Selection.

YouTube views

References

External links
 
 

Brat (digital network)
American drama web series
American LGBT-related web series
American teen drama web series
2019 web series debuts
YouTube original programming
2010s YouTube series